The 1973 Xavier Musketeers football team was an American football team that represented Xavier University as an independent during the 1973 NCAA Division I football season. In its second season under head coach Tom Cecchini, the team compiled a 5–5–1 record and was outscored by a total of 376 to 191.

On December 19, 1973, the Xavier University Board of Trustees voted 15 to 3 to discontinue the school's intercollegiate football program, effective immediately. The university's president, Rev. Robert W. Mulligan, attributed the decision to the "spiraling costs of intercollegiate football" which had led to a $200,000 deficit in 1973 despite the team having its most successful season in five years.

Schedule

References

Xavier
Xavier Musketeers football seasons
Xavier Musketeers football